The Diocese of Faenza was a Roman Catholic diocese in central Italy. In 1986 it was merged with the diocese of Modigliana to create the Diocese of Faenza-Modigliana.

References

External links
 GCatholic.org

Former Roman Catholic dioceses in Italy

it:Diocesi di Faenza-Modigliana